In mathematics, a selection principle is a rule asserting
the possibility of obtaining mathematically significant objects by 
selecting elements from given sequences of sets. The theory of selection principles
studies these principles and their relations to other mathematical properties.
Selection principles mainly describe covering properties, 
measure- and category-theoretic properties, and local properties in 
topological spaces, especially function spaces. Often, the 
characterization of a mathematical property using a selection 
principle is a nontrivial task leading to new insights on the 
characterized property.

The main selection principles
In 1924, Karl Menger
 
introduced the following basis property for metric spaces: 
Every basis of the topology contains a sequence of sets with vanishing 
diameters that covers the space. Soon thereafter, 
Witold Hurewicz 
observed that Menger's basis property is equivalent to the 
following selective property: for every sequence of open covers of the space, 
one can select finitely many open sets from each cover in the sequence, such that the family of all selected sets covers the space.
Topological spaces having this covering property are called Menger spaces.

Hurewicz's reformulation of Menger's property was the first important 
topological property described by a selection principle. 
Let  and  be classes of mathematical objects.
In 1996, Marion Scheepers 
introduced the following selection hypotheses,
capturing a large number of classic mathematical properties:

 : For every sequence  of elements from the class , there are elements  such that .
 : For every sequence  of elements from the class , there are finite subsets  such that .

In the case where the classes  and  consist of covers of some ambient space, Scheepers also introduced the following selection principle.

 : For every sequence  of elements from the class , none containing a finite subcover, there are finite subsets  such that .

Later, Boaz Tsaban identified the prevalence of the following related principle:
: Every member of the class  contains a member of the class .

The notions thus defined are selection principles. However, these terminologies are used interchangeably in the literature.

Variations

In 1999, Ljubisa D.R. Kocinac introduced the following star selection principles:

 : For every sequence  of elements from the class , there are elements  such that .
 : For every sequence  of elements from the class , there are finite subsets  such that .

The star selection principles are special cases of the general selection principles. This can be seen by modifying the definition of the family  accordingly.

Covering properties

Covering properties form the kernel of the theory of selection principles.  Selection properties that are not covering properties are often studied by using implications to and from selective covering properties of related spaces.

Let  be a topological space. (Formally, but usually the space  is fixed in the background.) The above-mentioned property of Menger is, thus, . In 1942, Fritz Rothberger considered Borel's strong measure zero sets, and introduced a topological variation later called Rothberger space (also known as C space). In the notation of selections, Rothberger's property is the property .

(This type of cover was considered by Gerlits and Nagy, in the third item of a certain list in their paper. The list was enumerated by Greek letters, and thus these covers are often called -covers.) A topological space is a Hurewicz space if it satisfies  .

A topological space is a γ-space if it satisfies  .

By using star selection hypotheses one obtains properties such as star-Menger, star-Rothberger and star-Hurewicz.

The Scheepers Diagram
Some of them are trivial (hold for all spaces, or fail for all spaces). Restricting attention to Lindelöf spaces, the diagram below, known as the Scheepers Diagram, presents nontrivial selection properties of the above form, and every nontrivial selection property is equivalent to one in the diagram. Arrows denote implications.

Local properties

Selection principles also capture important local properties.

The class  consists of the countable elements of the class .

 A space  is Fréchet–Urysohn if and only if it satisfies  for all points .
 A space  is strongly Fréchet–Urysohn if and only if it satisfies  for all points .
 A space  has countable tightness if and only if it satisfies  for all points .
 A space  has countable fan tightness if and only if it satisfies  for all points .
 A space  has countable strong fan tightness if and only if it satisfies  for all points .

Topological games

There are close connections between selection principles and topological games.

The Menger game

Let  be a topological space. It has an inning per each natural number .
If the family  is a cover of the space , then Bob wins the game. Otherwise, Alice wins.

A strategy for a player is a function determining the move of the player, given the earlier moves of both players. A strategy for a player is a winning strategy if each play where this player sticks to this strategy is won by this player.

 A topological space is  if and only if Alice has no winning strategy in the game  played on this space.
 Let  be a metric space. Bob has a winning strategy in the game  played on the space  if and only if the space  is -compact.

Note that among Lindelöf spaces, metrizable is equivalent to regular and second-countable, and so the previous result may alternatively be obtained by considering limited information strategies. A Markov strategy is one that only uses the most recent move of the opponent and the current round number.

 Let  be a regular space. Bob has a winning Markov strategy in the game  played on the space  if and only if the space  is -compact.
 Let  be a second-countable space. Bob has a winning Markov strategy in the game  played on the space  if and only if he has a winning perfect-information strategy.

In a similar way, we define games for other selection principles from the given Scheepers Diagram. In all these cases a topological space has a property from the Scheepers Diagram if and only if Alice has no winning strategy in the corresponding game. But this does not hold in general: 
Let  be the family of k-covers of a space. That is, such that every compact set in the space is covered by some member of the cover.
Francis Jordan demonstrated a space where the selection principle  holds, but 
Alice has a winning strategy for the game

Examples and properties
 Every  space is a Lindelöf space.
 .
 .
 Assuming the Continuum Hypothesis, there are sets of real numbers witnessing that the above implications cannot be reversed.
 Every Luzin set is  but no .
 Every Sierpiński set is Hurewicz.

Subsets of the real line  (with the induced subspace topology) holding selection principle properties, most notably Menger and Hurewicz spaces, can be characterized by their continuous images in the Baire space . For functions , write  if  for all but finitely many natural numbers . The set  is bounded if there is a function  such that  for all functions . The set  is dominating if for each function  there is a function  such that .

 A subset of the real line is  if and only if every continuous image of that space into the Baire space is not dominating.
 A subset of the real line is  if and only if every continuous image of that space into the Baire space is bounded.

Connections with other fields

General topology

 Every  space is a D-space.
Let P be a property of spaces. A space  is productively P if, for each space  with property P, the product space  has property P.

 Assuming the Continuum Hypothesis, every productively Lindelöf space is productively 
 Let  be a  subset of the real line, and  be a meager subset of the real line. Then the set  is meager.

Measure theory

 Every  subset of the real line is a strong measure zero set.

Function spaces

Let  be a Tychonoff space, and  be the space of continuous functions  with pointwise convergence topology. 
  satisfies  if and only if  is Fréchet–Urysohn if and only if  is strong Fréchet–Urysohn.
  satisfies  if and only if  has countable strong fan tightness.
  satisfies  if and only if  has countable fan tightness.

See also 
 Compact space
 Sigma-compact
 Menger space
 Hurewicz space
 Rothberger space

References

Properties of topological spaces
Topology